Great Sewer may refer to:

 Cloaca Maxima (=Great Sewer in Latin language),  the main sewer in Ancient Rome 
 Menilmontant brook, a small river in Paris (France) used as great sewer from the 16h to the 19th century